Yefremov is a town and the administrative center of Yefremovsky District in Tula Oblast, Russia, located on the Krasivaya Mecha River (Don's tributary),  south of Tula, the administrative center of the oblast. Population:

History
It was founded in 1637 as a fortress defending the southern borders of the Tsardom of Russia. It was granted town status in 1777.

Yefremov was occupied by the German Army briefly during World War II. The occupation lasted from November 23 to December 13, 1941.

A Soviet Air Force facility, Yefremov air base, was constructed east of the town during the Cold War.

Administrative and municipal status
Within the framework of administrative divisions, Yefremov serves as the administrative center of Yefremovsky District and is incorporated within it as a town under district jurisdiction. As a municipal division, the town of Yefremov, together with 206 rural localities in Yefremovsky District, is incorporated as Yefremov Urban Okrug.

Sister city
 Liptovský Mikuláš, Slovakia

References

Notes

Sources

External links
Unofficial website of Yefremov 

Cities and towns in Tula Oblast
Yefremovsky Uyezd